Ross Sabberton (born 4 October 1978) is a British sprint canoer who competed in the early 2000s. At the 2000 Summer Olympics in Sydney, he was eliminated in the semifinals of both the K-2 500 m and the K-2 1000 m events.

References
Sports-Reference.com profile

1978 births
Canoeists at the 2000 Summer Olympics
Living people
Olympic canoeists of Great Britain
British male canoeists